Flårjuven Bluff is a flat-topped, largely ice-free bluff about  north of Storkletten Peak, on the Ahlmann Ridge in Queen Maud Land, Antarctica. It was mapped by Norwegian cartographers from surveys and air photos by the Norwegian–British–Swedish Antarctic Expedition (1949–52) and named Flårjuven. Aurnupen Peak lies 1 mile (1.6 km) north.

References 

Cliffs of Queen Maud Land
Princess Martha Coast